Patrobinae is a subfamily of ground beetles in the family Carabidae. There are more than 20 genera and 240 described species in Patrobinae.

There are two tribes in this subfamily, Lissopogonini and Patrobini. Lissopogonini contains only one genus, Lissopogonus, while the other genera of this subfamily are members of Patrobini.

Genera
These 29 genera belong to the subfamily Patrobinae:

 Tribe Lissopogonini Zamotajlov, 2000
 Lissopogonus Andrewes, 1923
 Tribe Patrobini Kirby, 1837
 Deltomerus Motschulsky, 1850
 Deltomerodes Deuve, 1992
 Apatrobus Habu & Baba, 1960
 Apenetretus Kurnakov, 1960
 Archipatrobus Zamotajlov, 1992
 Caelopenetretus Zamotajlov & Ito, 2000
 Chaetapatrobus Lafer, 1996
 Chinapenetretus Kurnakov, 1963
 Dimorphopatrobus Casale & Sciaky, 1994
 Diplous Motschulsky, 1850
 Grandipenetretus Zamotajlov & Sciaky, 1999
 Himalopenetretus Zamotajlov, 2002
 Indopatrobus Zamotajlov & Wrase, 2006
 Ledouxius Zamotajlov, 1992
 Minipenetretus Zamotajlov, 2002
 Minypatrobus Ueno, 1955
 Naxipenetretus Zamotajlov, 1999
 Parapatrobus Zamotajlov, 1992
 Parapenetretus Kurnakov, 1960
 Patanitretus Zamotajlov, 2002
 Patrobus Dejean, 1821
 Penetretus Motschulsky, 1865
 Platidiolus Chaudoir, 1878
 Platypatrobus Darlington, 1938
 Prodiplous Zamotajlov & Sciaky, 2006
 Qiangopatrobus Zamotajlov, 2002
 Quasipenetretus Zamotajlov, 2002
 Tibetopenetretus Zamotajlov & Sciaky, 1999

References

Carabidae
Beetle subfamilies